The WhatsOnStage Award for Best Performer in a Female Identifying Role in a Play is an annual award presented by WhatsOnStage.com as part of the annual WhatsOnStage Awards. Founded in 2001 as the Theatregoers' Choice Awards, the WhatsOnStage Awards are based on a popular vote recognising performers and productions in London's West End theatre.

This award is given to a person who has performed a leading female identifying role in a play during the eligibility year. Introduced in 2001 as the award for Best Actress in a Play, the category was renamed in 2022 in an effort to be more inclusive. The category was discontinued following the 2022 ceremony and was replaced with the gender-neutral WhatsOnstage Award for Best Performer in a Play.

Kristin Scott Thomas and Billie Piper are the only performers to have won the award twice. Helen McCrory holds the record for most nominations in the category, with five, and also the most nominations without a win.

Winners and nominees

2000s

2010s

2020s

Multiple wins and nominations

Wins
2 wins
 Billie Piper
 Kristin Scott Thomas

Nominations
5 nominations
 Helen McCrory

4 nominations
 Eve Best
 Kristin Scott Thomas

3 nominations
 Tamsin Greig
 Clare Higgins
 Billie Piper

2 nominations

References

External links
 Official website

British theatre awards
Awards for actresses